Missouri Valley Conference Championship or Missouri Valley Conference Tournament may refer to:

Missouri Valley Conference men's basketball tournament, the men's basketball championship tournament
Missouri Valley Conference women's basketball tournament, the women's basketball championship tournament